The term dilution assay is generally used to designate a special type of bioassay in which one or more preparations (e.g. a drug) are administered to experimental units   at different dose levels inducing a measurable biological response. The dose levels are prepared by dilution in a diluent that is inert in respect of the response. The   experimental units can for example be cell-cultures, tissues, organs or living animals. The biological response may be quantal (e.g. positive/negative) or quantitative (e.g.   growth). The goal is to relate the response to the dose, usually by interpolation techniques, and in many cases to express the potency/activity of the test preparation(s)   relative to a standard of known potency/activity.

Dilution assays can be direct or indirect. In a direct dilution assay the amount of dose needed to produce a specific (fixed) response is measured, so that the dose is a   stochastic variable defining the tolerance distribution. Conversely, in an indirect dilution assay the dose levels are administered at fixed dose levels, so that the   response is a stochastic variable.

Statistical models
For a mathematical definition of a dilution assay an observation space  is defined and a function  so that the responses    are mapped to the set of real numbers. It is now assumed that a function  exists which relates the dose  to the   response

In situations where a standard preparation is included it is furthermore assumed that the test preparation    behaves like a dilution (or concentration) of the standard 
, for all 
This is the fundamental assumption of similarity of dose-response curves which is necessary for a meaningful   and unambiguous definition of the relative potency. The latter can be shown to be a limit case of  so if  is written for the   log transformation the above equation can be redefined as
, for all .

Statistical techniques such as optimization by Maximum Likelihood can be used to calculate estimates of the parameters. Of notable importance in this respect is the theory of Generalized Linear Models with which a wide range of dilution assays can be modelled. Estimates of  may describe  satisfactorily over the range of doses tested, but they do not necessarily have to describe  beyond that range. However, this does not mean that dissimilar curves can be restricted to an interval where they happen to be similar.

In practice,  itself is rarely of interest. These   estimates involve taking ratios of statistically dependent parameter estimates. Fieller's theorem can be used to compute confidence intervals of these ratios.

Some special cases deserve particular mention because of their widespread use: If  is linear and  this is known as a slope-ratio model. If    is linear and  this is known as a parallel line model. Another commonly applied model is the probit model where  is   the cumulative normal distribution function,  and  follows a binomial distribution.

Example: Microbiological assay of antibiotics

An antibiotic standard (shown in red) and test preparation (shown in blue) are applied at three dose levels to sensitive microorganisms on a layer of agar in petri dishes. The  stronger the  dose the larger the zone of inhibition of growth of the microorganisms. The biological response  is in this case the zone of inhibition and the  diameter of this  zone  can be used as the measurable response. The doses  are transformed to logarithms  and the method of  least squares is  used to fit two parallel lines to the data. The horizontal distance  between the two lines (shown in green) serves as an estimate of the  potency   of the test preparation relative to the standard.

Software

The major statistical software packages do not cover dilution assays although a statistician should not have difficulties to write suitable scripts or macros to that end. Several special purpose software packages for dilution assays exist.

References

 Finney, D.J. (1971). Probit Analysis, 3rd Ed. Cambridge University Press, Cambridge. 
 Finney, D.J. (1978). Statistical Method in Biological Assay, 3rd Ed. Griffin, London. 
 Govindarajulu, Z. (2001). Statistical Techniques in Bioassay, 2nd revised and enlarged edition, Karger, New York.

External links

Software for dilution assays:
PLA
CombiStats
Unistat
BioAssay

Pharmaceutical industry
Drug discovery
Biostatistics